Blessington Gaelic Athletic Association is a Gaelic football, hurling, camogie and ladies' Gaelic football club based in Blessington, County Wicklow, Ireland.

History
The club was founded in 1909, initially playing its games in the Burgage near to the cemetery. The club crest depicts St. Mark's Cross, a high cross was moved to Burgage cemetery when its original home was flooded by the creation of Poulaphouca Reservoir. Blessington GAA won their first Wicklow Senior Football Championship in 1915.

Blessington won both junior and intermediate county titles in 1979, following up that success with a second senior title in 1983.

Blessington moved to new grounds purchased from the O'Leary family in 2007. They won their third senior title in 2021.

Honours

Gaelic football
 Wicklow Senior Football Championship (3): 1915, 1983, 2021 
 Wicklow Intermediate Football Championship (5): 1928, 1936, 1946, 1949, 1979 
 Wicklow Junior Football Championship (5): 1931, 1974, 1979, 2000, 2002

Notable members
Jack Boothman (GAA President)
Raymond Daniels
Billy Gobbett (handballer)
Michael McLoughlin
Vincent Flood

References

External links
Official website (archived version)

Gaelic games clubs in County Wicklow